The southern red-backed vole or Gapper's red-backed vole (Myodes gapperi) is a small slender vole found in Canada and the northern United States. It is closely related to the western red-backed vole (Myodes californius), which lives to the south and west of its range and which is less red with a less sharply bicolored tail.

Description
These voles have short slender bodies with a reddish band along the back and a short tail. The sides of the body and head are grey and the underparts are paler. There is a grey color morph in the northeast part of their range. They are active year-round, mostly at night. They use burrows created by other small animals, such as squirrels and groundhogs.

Habitat

These animals are found in coniferous, deciduous, and mixed forests, often near wetlands. They use runways through the surface growth in warm weather and tunnel through the snow in winter. They are omnivorous feeding on green plants, underground fungi, seeds, nuts, roots, also insects, snails, and berries. They store roots, bulbs, and nuts for later use.

Predators
Predators include hawks, owls, and mustelids.

Breeding
Female voles have two to four litters of two to eight young in a year.

References

External links
Nature Works TV.org: Southern Red-backed Vole

Southern red-backed vole
Mammals of Canada
Mammals of the United States
Rodents of North America
Fauna of the Eastern United States
Fauna of the Plains-Midwest (United States)
Mammals described in 1830
Least concern biota of North America
Least concern biota of the United States